Pilat Regional Natural Park (French: Parc naturel régional du Pilat) is a protected area of mountainous countryside in the Auvergne-Rhône-Alpes region of southeastern France.

Forty-seven communes dot the landscape, with approximately fifty thousand residents. The land was officially designated a regional natural park in 1974.

Member communes
The park includes 47 member communes:

Ampuis
Le Bessat
Bessey
Bourg-Argental
Burdignes
Chavanay
Chuyer
La Chapelle-Villars
Châteauneuf
Colombier
Condrieu
Doizieux

Échalas
Farnay
Graix
Les Haies
Jonzieux
Loire-sur-Rhône
Longes
Lupé
Maclas
Malleval
Marlhes
Pavezin

Pélussin
Planfoy
Roisey
Saint-Appolinard
Sainte-Croix-en-Jarez
Saint-Genest-Malifaux
Saint-Julien-Molin-Molette
Saint-Michel-sur-Rhône
Saint-Paul-en-Jarez
Saint-Pierre-de-Bœuf
Saint-Régis-du-Coin
Saint-Romain-en-Gal

Saint-Romain-les-Atheux
Saint-Sauveur-en-Rue
Tarentaise
La Terrasse-sur-Dorlay
Thélis-la-Combe
Trèves
Tupin-et-Semons
La Valla-en-Gier
Véranne
Vérin
La Versanne

See also
 List of regional natural parks of France

References

External links
 Official park website 

Regional natural parks of France
Geography of Auvergne-Rhône-Alpes
Geography of Rhône (department)
Geography of Loire (department)
Tourist attractions in Rhône (department)
Tourist attractions in Loire (department)
Protected areas established in 1974
Tourist attractions in Auvergne-Rhône-Alpes